Jason Derek Brown (born July 1, 1969) is an American fugitive wanted for first degree murder and armed robbery in Phoenix, Arizona. On November 29, 2004, Brown allegedly shot and killed an armored car guard outside a movie theater and then fled with the money. On December 8, 2007, he was named by the FBI as the 489th fugitive to be placed on its Ten Most Wanted list. He is considered to be armed and extremely dangerous. On September 7, 2022, he was removed from the Ten Most Wanted list without being captured, but he is still wanted. He was replaced on the list by Michael James Pratt. In 2022, a feature film about Brown's life, American Murderer, starring Tom Pelphrey, Ryan Phillippe, Idina Menzel, and Jacki Weaver was released in theaters and on demand.

Background
Brown was born in Los Angeles, California, on July 1, 1969, to David John Brown Sr. He attended Laguna Beach High School. Brown speaks fluent French and has a master's degree in international business. He served a mission for the Church of Jesus Christ of Latter-day Saints in Paris from 1988 to 1990.

Between 1990 and 2004, Brown resided at several places in Orange County, California, including Dana Point and the Corona del Mar neighborhood of Newport Beach.

Motive
Brown owned two businesses, Toys Unlimited and On The Doorstep Advertising, both of which he ran out of his home in Salt Lake City, Utah. He had been employed as a toy salesman and golf equipment importer to support his luxurious lifestyle and expensive tastes in such things as cars, motorbikes, and boats. Brown portrayed himself as a wealthy man, despite the fact that by 2004 he had defaulted on at least one large loan and had racked up tens of thousands of dollars in debt. It is believed that Brown operated check and bank fraud scams for years in order to fund the image that he had created for himself. Phoenix Detective Paul Brown has stated that Brown may have been the perpetrator of a number of unsolved petty thefts and home invasions. He would sometimes go to car dealerships, clean-shaven and well-dressed, and purchase a car using a false Social Security number and address.

Means
In November 2004, days after having bought a .45 caliber Glock pistol, Brown took a firearms instruction course at Totally Awesome Guns & Range in Salt Lake City. He had passed a background check and submitted his fingerprints that were sent to state and federal authorities. Brown's instructor, Clark Aposhian, described him as an "obnoxious student" and inexperienced with firearms. During a practice shooting days before the murder, Brown accidentally fired a round into a truck, for which he later paid its owner approximately US$1,300 in damages. At this time, Brown was living in an Ahwatukee, Arizona, hotel near an AMC movie theater. He was captured on surveillance tape having a conversation with another man in the hotel lobby. The man is considered to be a possible accomplice or witness; however, his identity remains unknown.

Robbery and murder
On November 29, 2004, Robert Keith Palomares, a 24-year-old armored car guard, was carrying the weekend deposits outside the AMC theater at 4915 E. Ray Road in Phoenix. At approximately 10 a.m., a hooded gunman ambushed and shot Palomares with a .45-caliber semiautomatic Glock. Five out of six bullets fired struck Palomares in the head. Although armed, Palomares had no time to defend himself. The gunman took a moneybag containing $56,000 in cash, ran into a nearby alley, and fled the scene on a bicycle. Palomares was transported to Good Samaritan Hospital, where he was pronounced dead. Witnesses initially described the shooter as being anywhere from 25 to 30 years old and Hispanic. However, authorities recovered the bicycle and lifted fingerprints from it that instead linked Brown to the ambush murder. Accordingly, he was soon considered the prime suspect in the case, and an arrest warrant was issued on December 4 by Maricopa County Superior Court charging Brown with first degree murder and armed robbery. Brown was later also charged with unlawful flight to avoid prosecution in a federal arrest warrant issued on December 6 by the United States District Court for the District of Arizona. Investigators have considered Brown's desperate financial situation as a possible motive.

Fugitive
Soon after being identified as a suspect, Brown fled from Arizona to Henderson, Nevada. He continued on to Las Vegas where he swapped his BMW M3 for a black Cadillac Escalade he had in storage. He then drove to Orange County, California, where he stayed with some relatives until December 6, 2004, when FBI agents carrying out an arrest warrant missed him by one hour. Brown apparently used his credit card at a gas station in southern Orange County, traveled to San Diego near the Mexican border and then all the way to Portland, Oregon. After this, the FBI states that Brown became a "ghost" and went completely off-the-grid.

On January 16, 2005, authorities discovered his abandoned Cadillac left in a long-term parking lot at the Portland International Airport. While in Portland, the fugitive mailed a package with clothes and golf equipment to his older brother, David John Brown II of San Diego. On April 20, 2005, David Brown was indicted for obstruction of justice. The indictment claimed that he tampered with evidence when he deep-cleaned his brother Jason's BMW in early December, after having driven the vehicle to California from a Las Vegas storage facility. The FBI had asked him whether he knew of any storage lockers that his younger brother had in Las Vegas; David Brown attested that he did not, but prosecutors were able to show that he did. David John Brown II pled guilty in 2007 to lying to the FBI, and a federal judge in Arizona sentenced David Brown to three years of probation.

By 2005 the FBI had received over 200 leads in the case, with the greater part of them being outside Arizona and with dozens coming outside the United States, including possible sightings in Canada. Due to his "California surfer dude" appearance and ability to blend into crowds, the FBI has had more leads on Brown than anyone else on its Ten Most Wanted list, with the majority of them proving false leads. Reporters have noted his striking resemblance to actor Sean Penn; one of Penn's body doubles was once arrested by authorities when they mistook him for Brown.

On December 8, 2007, Brown was named by the FBI as the 489th fugitive to be placed on its Ten Most Wanted list. The FBI is offering a reward of up to $200,000 for information leading to his capture (the reward was doubled on March 25, 2013). The most recent disclosed credible sighting came in August 2008, near the Hogle Zoo in Salt Lake City. An acquaintance of Brown, someone who had gone to missionary training with him and accompanied him on his mission to France, recognized him when they were both stopped at a traffic light. Upon their mutual recognition, Brown promptly accelerated through the stoplight and sped away. The witness shared his sighting with the authorities. According to him, Brown had a deeper tan and had longer hair compared to the 2004 photograph on his wanted poster. Brown had previously lived in Salt Lake City and was known to have contacts in the area. Juan Becerra, an FBI special agent in Salt Lake City, suggested that he was in Salt Lake City to visit people whom he knew. "It's very hard for individuals to change the way they live, the way they behave," Becerra said. "This is a guy who stays in shape, likes fitness, likes to look good. We're hoping he's... been seen at a nightclub or fitness club." He stated that Brown was comfortable outdoors, which may have been another reason for wanting to live in Salt Lake City.

Investigators believe that Brown may be hiding in plain sight among the Mormon community under an assumed identity, living with a partner who might not know his real identity, or that he has fled the country and could be living in France, Quebec or Thailand.

See also
 List of fugitives from justice who disappeared

References

External links
Brown's profile on America's Most Wanted
Jason Derek Brown's FBI Top 10 Most Wanted Fugitive Alert

1969 births
2000s missing person cases
2004 murders in the United States
20th-century American businesspeople
20th-century Mormon missionaries
21st-century American criminals
American bank robbers
American male criminals
American Mormon missionaries in France
American salespeople
Businesspeople from Arizona
Businesspeople from Salt Lake City
Crime in Arizona
Criminals from Arizona
Criminals from California
Criminals from Los Angeles
Criminals from Utah
FBI Ten Most Wanted Fugitives
Fugitives wanted by the United States
Fugitives wanted on murder charges
Fugitives wanted on robbery charges
Living people
People excommunicated by the Church of Jesus Christ of Latter-day Saints
People from Newport Beach, California